Purine metabolism refers to the metabolic pathways to synthesize and break down purines that are present in many organisms.

Biosynthesis
Purines are biologically synthesized as nucleotides and in particular as ribotides, i.e. bases attached to ribose 5-phosphate. Both adenine and guanine are derived from the nucleotide inosine monophosphate (IMP), which is the first compound in the pathway to have a completely formed purine ring system.

IMP

Inosine monophosphate is synthesized on a pre-existing ribose-phosphate through a complex pathway (as shown in the figure on the right). The source of the carbon and nitrogen atoms of the purine ring, 5 and 4 respectively, come from multiple sources. The amino acid glycine contributes all its carbon (2) and nitrogen (1) atoms, with additional nitrogen atoms from glutamine (2) and aspartic acid (1), and additional carbon atoms from formyl groups (2), which are transferred from the coenzyme tetrahydrofolate as 10-formyltetrahydrofolate, and a carbon atom from bicarbonate (1). Formyl groups build carbon-2 and carbon-8 in the purine ring system, which are the ones acting as bridges between two nitrogen atoms.

A key regulatory step is the production of 5-phospho-α-D-ribosyl 1-pyrophosphate (PRPP) by ribose phosphate pyrophosphokinase, which is activated by inorganic phosphate and inactivated by purine ribonucleotides. It is not the committed step to purine synthesis because PRPP is also used in pyrimidine synthesis and salvage pathways.

The first committed step is the reaction of PRPP, glutamine and water to 5'-phosphoribosylamine (PRA), glutamate, and pyrophosphate - catalyzed by amidophosphoribosyltransferase, which is activated by PRPP and inhibited by AMP, GMP and IMP.

PRPP + L-Glutamine + H2O → PRA + L-Glutamate + PPi

In the second step react PRA, glycine and ATP to create GAR, ADP, and pyrophosphate - catalyzed by phosphoribosylamine—glycine ligase (GAR synthetase). Due to the chemical lability of PRA, which has a half-life of 38 seconds at PH 7.5 and 37 °C, researchers have suggested that the compound is channeled from amidophosphoribosyltransferase to GAR synthetase in vivo.

PRA + Glycine + ATP → GAR + ADP + Pi

The third is catalyzed by phosphoribosylglycinamide formyltransferase.

GAR + fTHF → fGAR + THF

The fourth is catalyzed by phosphoribosylformylglycinamidine synthase.

fGAR + L-Glutamine + ATP → fGAM + L-Glutamate + ADP + Pi

The fifth is catalyzed by AIR synthetase (FGAM cyclase).

fGAM + ATP → AIR + ADP + Pi + H2O

The sixth is catalyzed by phosphoribosylaminoimidazole carboxylase.

AIR + CO2 → CAIR + 2H+

The seventh is catalyzed by phosphoribosylaminoimidazolesuccinocarboxamide synthase.

CAIR + L-Aspartate + ATP → SAICAR + ADP + Pi

The eight is catalyzed by adenylosuccinate lyase.

SAICAR → AICAR + Fumarate

The products AICAR and fumarate move on to two different pathways. AICAR serves as the reactant for the ninth step, while fumarate is transported to the citric acid cycle which can then skip the carbon dioxide evolution steps to produce malate. The conversion of fumarate to malate is catalyzed by fumarase. In this way, fumarate connects purine synthesis to the citric acid cycle.

The ninth is catalyzed by phosphoribosylaminoimidazolecarboxamide formyltransferase.

AICAR + fTHF → FAICAR + THF

The last step is catalyzed by Inosine monophosphate synthase.

FAICAR → IMP + H2O

In eukaryotes the second, third, and fifth step are catalyzed by trifunctional purine biosynthetic protein adenosine-3, which is encoded by the GART gene.

Both ninth and tenth step are accomplished by a single protein named Bifunctional purine biosynthesis protein PURH, encoded by the ATIC gene.

GMP
 IMP dehydrogenase (IMPDH) converts IMP into XMP
 GMP synthase converts XMP into GMP
 GMP reductase converts GMP back into IMP

AMP
 adenylosuccinate synthase converts IMP to adenylosuccinate
 adenylosuccinate lyase converts adenylosuccinate into AMP
 AMP deaminase converts AMP back into IMP

Degradation
Purines are metabolised by several enzymes:

Guanine
 A nuclease frees the nucleotide
 A nucleotidase creates guanosine
 Purine nucleoside phosphorylase converts guanosine to guanine
 Guanase converts guanine to xanthine
 Xanthine oxidase (a form of xanthine oxidoreductase) catalyzes the oxidation of xanthine to uric acid

Adenine
 A nuclease frees the nucleotide
 A nucleotidase creates adenosine, then adenosine deaminase creates inosine
 Alternatively, AMP deaminase creates inosinic acid, then a nucleotidase creates inosine
 Purine nucleoside phosphorylase acts upon inosine to create hypoxanthine
 Xanthine oxidase catalyzes the biotransformation of hypoxanthine to xanthine
 Xanthine oxidase acts upon xanthine to create uric acid

Regulations of purine nucleotide biosynthesis
The formation of 5'-phosphoribosylamine from glutamine and PRPP catalysed by PRPP amino transferase is the regulation point for purine synthesis. The enzyme is an allosteric enzyme, so it can be converted from IMP, GMP and AMP in high concentration binds the enzyme to exerts inhibition while PRPP is in large amount binds to the enzyme which causes activation.  So IMP, GMP and AMP are inhibitors while PRPP is an activator. Between the formation of 5'-phosphoribosyl, aminoimidazole and IMP, there is no known regulation step.

Salvage
Purines from turnover of cellular nucleic acids (or from food) can also be salvaged and reused in new nucleotides.

 The enzyme adenine phosphoribosyltransferase (APRT) salvages adenine. 
 The enzyme hypoxanthine-guanine phosphoribosyltransferase (HGPRT) salvages guanine and hypoxanthine. (Genetic deficiency of HGPRT causes Lesch–Nyhan syndrome.)

Disorders
When a defective gene causes gaps to appear in the metabolic recycling process for purines and pyrimidines, these chemicals are not metabolised properly, and adults or children can suffer from any one of twenty-eight hereditary disorders, possibly some more as yet unknown. Symptoms can include gout, anaemia, epilepsy, delayed development, deafness, compulsive self-biting, kidney failure or stones, or loss of immunity.

Purine metabolism can have imbalances that can arise from harmful nucleotide triphosphates incorporating into DNA and RNA which further lead to genetic disturbances and mutations, and as a result, give rise to several types of diseases. Some of the diseases are:

Severe immunodeficiency by loss of adenosine deaminase.
Hyperuricemia and Lesch–Nyhan syndrome by the loss of hypoxanthine-guanine phosphoribosyltransferase.
Different types of cancer by an increase in the activities of enzymes like IMP dehydrogenase.

Pharmacotherapy
Modulation of purine metabolism has pharmacotherapeutic value.

Purine synthesis inhibitors inhibit the proliferation of cells, especially leukocytes.  These inhibitors include azathioprine, an immunosuppressant used in organ transplantation, autoimmune disease such as rheumatoid arthritis or inflammatory bowel disease such as Crohn's disease and ulcerative colitis.

Mycophenolate mofetil is an immunosuppressant drug used to prevent rejection in organ transplantation; it inhibits purine synthesis by blocking inosine monophosphate dehydrogenase (IMPDH).
Methotrexate also indirectly inhibits purine synthesis by blocking the metabolism of folic acid (it is an inhibitor of the dihydrofolate reductase).

Allopurinol is a drug that inhibits the enzyme xanthine oxidoreductase and, thus, lowers the level of uric acid in the body. This may be useful in the treatment of gout, which is a disease caused by excess uric acid, forming crystals in joints.

Prebiotic synthesis of purine ribonucleosides

In order to understand how life arose, knowledge is required of the chemical pathways that permit formation of the key building blocks of life under plausible prebiotic conditions.  Nam et al. demonstrated the direct condensation of purine and pyrimidine nucleobases with ribose to give ribonucleosides in aqueous microdroplets, a key step leading to RNA formation. Also, a plausible prebiotic process for synthesizing purine ribonucleosides was presented by Becker et al.

Purine biosynthesis in the three domains of life
Organisms in all three domains of life, eukaryotes, bacteria and archaea, are able to carry out de novo biosynthesis of purines.  This ability reflects the essentiality of purines for life.  The biochemical pathway of synthesis is very similar in eukaryotes and bacterial species, but is more variable among archaeal species.  A nearly complete, or complete, set of genes required for purine biosynthesis was determined to be present in 58 of the 65 archaeal species studied.  However, also identified were seven archaeal species with entirely, or nearly entirely, absent purine encoding genes.  Apparently the archaeal species unable to synthesize purines are able to acquire exogenous purines for growth., and are thus similar to purine mutants of eukaryotes, e.g. purine mutants of the Ascomycete fungus Neurospora crassa, that also require exogenous purines for growth.

See also 
 Purinergic signaling
 Disease-modifying antirheumatic drug (DMARD)

References

External links 
 The Medical Biochemistry Page
 Purine metabolism - Reference pathway
 PUMPA: Purine Metabolic Patients’ Association

Metabolic pathways
Biochemistry